Vivian Hsu (born March 19, 1975) is a Taiwanese singer and actress.

Hsu rose to prominence in Japan, where she made her first appearance in 1995 and has become a highly recognized celebrity with her countless appearances in media during the late 1990s.

She was also the main vocalist for Black Biscuits, a Japanese dance band which released four singles, Stamina, Timing, Relax, Bye-Bye, and one album, Life. Timing is one of the most successful songs of 1998.

Early life
The second of three children, Hsu was born to a Hakka father and Tayal Taiwanese mother as Hsu Su-chuan, and used this name until she began her modeling career. Her parents divorced when she was a young child. She attended Taichung Jianxing Elementary School and Taipei Shulinguo Junior High School.

Career
Hsu's career in entertainment industry started after winning first place in a "Talented Beautiful Girl" contest held by Taiwan's CTS in 1990. At that point, she was working by delivering food on her bicycle, and her customers began to recognise her from her television appearances. The same year she joined a musical trio named "Girls' Team" (少女隊). They released two albums, in 1991 and 1992, then broke up. Following this, Hsu started modeling.

Modelling
As a model, she posed in two photobooks titled Angel (天使心) and Venus. Angel, published in 1995, was shot in Capri and Sicily. Venus, published on July 7, 1996, was shot in Mexico and had separate runs in Taiwan and Japan.

Hsu's success in modeling achieved its zenith in July 1996 when she was featured on the cover of two biography (the Japanese edition, and the comparatively low-distribution Hong Kong edition).  Like the photobooks, both these items have become very sought after by collectors and fans.

Hsu has continued to model for designers such as Hang Ten, Gucci and Mode Marie, and has modelled in all three of her brief, autobiographical books: Earth Onigiri (2001), Privacy (2001), and Wo Ai Taiwan (2002). In addition, most of her musical albums contain substantial inserts featuring new modelling work.

Acting
Hsu has appeared in a number of films and television programs both in China and Japan. She appeared in the ambitious 2006 mainland China-Taiwan-Hong Kong collaboration The Knot, a romance film that takes place between the CCP's takeover of mainland China and the present. Her debut film was Shaolin Popey (1994), a comedy film which became a box office hit in Taiwan and Hong Kong. She also has some experience as a voice actress, having voiced Aisha in Gundam SEED for three episodes.

Hsu also starred in three Hong Kong Category III motion pictures, Hunting List, Devil Angel and Angel Heart. She appeared in the 2001 film The Accidental Spy, with Jackie Chan. She played the role of Chao Jiale in Love Storm (2003), alongside Vic Chou and Ken Chu. She also composed and sang the opening theme for this series, Decide to Love You (決定愛你), which was released as a single in 2003. As with many actors and actresses, she appears from time to time in commercials and as spokesperson for various causes. In 2006, Hsu played a role in the film The Shoe Fairy of Do Do, a modern fairy tale.

Since 2010 she has appeared in television commercials for the aesthetic salon Slim Beauty House, and Kao's Essential hair care brand line as one of its three newfaces along with Yuriko Yoshitaka and Nozomi Sasaki.

Music
Hsu released her first solo single in 1995. She released her first full-length album, Tianshi Xiang (天使想) in 1996. Shortly thereafter, she took a speed course in Korean, and released a Korean version of the album titled Cheonsa Misonyeo (天使美少女). Unusually, neither of Hsu's first two albums was sung in her native language.

In 1997, with two Japanese comedians—Kyoya Nanami and Amazan—and later with a second female vocalist known as 'Keddy', she was included in a musical act known as the Black Biscuits. The group was formed primarily as a "rival band" for the Japanese music group Pocket Biscuits, which was the creation of the Japanese variety show Utchan Nanchan no UriNari. Between 1997 and 1999, they released four hit singles and a full-length album, Life.  Their single CD Timing recorded 1.5 million sales in 1998. They participated in Kōhaku Uta Gassen in 1998.

Towards the end of the group's run, they failed to accomplish one of the challenges set forth by the variety show and the resulting punishment was the disbanding of Black Biscuits.

During this period, Hsu also released two more solo albums: Da Mafan (大麻煩) in 1998, and Bubai de Lianren (不敗の戀人) in 1999. She followed Bubai de Lianren with a Japanese translation, Fuhai no Koibito, in 2000.

Later that same year she released another new album, Jiaban de Tianshi (假扮的天使).

In 2001, she formed The d.e.p with Masahide Sakuma, Gota Yashiki, Masami Tsuchiya and Mick Karn. The band was short-lived: by the end of the year they had released all the music they ever would. This amounted to two singles and a full-length album, 地球的病気 -We Are the d.e.p-.

Over the next two years, she released a few more singles, including, alongside Kazuma Endo of Siam Shade, Moment, the second opening theme to Mobile Suit Gundam SEED, followed in 2003 by her next solo album, The Secret to Happiness Is Love. Her last album is Hen Hen Ai (狠狠愛), released in April 2005. Her most recent album is Vivi and..., released in September 2006. For this album, Hsu collaborated with many artists and people including Jay Chou, Wang Leehom, Gary Cao, Nicky Lee and even her little brother and uncle.

Hsu returned to Japan after a seven-year absence to release her new single Beautiful Day on March 3, 2010.

Hsu's music, especially in her later work, covers a great range of genres. Included are slow love songs, R&B, hard rock, and of course J-pop. She has even dabbled in rap. This, combined with the fact that she is fluent in Mandarin, Cantonese, and Japanese makes her a very versatile artist.

Hsu is also an accomplished lyricist. Her lyric-writing talent first gained serious notice when she completed several songs for Taiwan's R&B singer-songwriter Jay Chou. By proving that she is not just another pretty idol, but a very capable artist, Hsu surprised both her critics and adorned fans. She continued to collaborate with Jay on his second and third albums after his triumphant self-titled debut, and co-wrote songs for other pop performers, such as Leehom Wang, Vanness Wu, Show Lo and Gigi Leung. Her lyric work is much praised for its clever and straightforward simplicity.

Personal life
In January 2014, Vivian got engaged to 36-year-old Singapore businessman Sean Lee of Marco Polo Marine Limited. They held a wedding ceremony in Bali, Indonesia on June 26. Hsu announced her pregnancy in March 2015 via Facebook calling the pregnancy a "surprise" and "heaven sent" and said it came at a time when the self-professed workaholic promised to clear her work schedule in 2015 to focus on starting a family. On August 13, 2015, she gave birth to a boy, Dalton.

Filmography

Discography

Songwriting credits
 Adorable Woman, Jay from Jay
 Tornado, Jay Chou from Jay
 Istanbul, Jay Chou from Jay
 Simple Love, Jay Chou Fantasy
 Can't Say Anything, Jay from Fantasy
 The Cliff of Love, Jay Chou from Yeh Hui-Mei
 Want to love you, Jerry Yen "Jerry for you the first time"
 Imagine ten of you, Vanness Wu "Body Can Sing"
 That girl, Vanness Wu "Body Can Sing"
 Fantastic love, Vanness Wu "V.Dubb"
 Reborn, Ken "Never Stop"
 Journey, Fei "Trip EP "
 Paradise, Harlem Yu "Harlem Heaven"
 Emergency Tears, Gigi "Magical Season"
 Hold you tight, Gigi "Sense of Belonging"
 Confessions, Zhang Huichun "Solo"
 Love, Nicholas Tse "Release"
 You say yours I say mine, Show Lo "Show Time"
 Happiness Hunter, Show Lo "SPEShow"
 Love Castle, Cyndi "Honey"
 Go with you Kim Jeong Hoon "Love Strategy"
 If you love, Khalil Fong "Orange Moon"
 Listen to me, Ruby
 Walking together, Kim Jeong Hoon "Love Strategy"
 The Daily Recipes, Wang Leehom "The 18 Martial Arts"
 The Everlasting Happiness, BoBo "Let's BoBo"

References

External links

Vivian Hsu at Universal Music Japan 
Vivian Hsu at Ameba 
Vivian Hsu at Avex Taiwan 
Vivian Hsu's Advertising Works 

1975 births
Living people
20th-century Taiwanese actresses
21st-century Taiwanese actresses
Expatriate television personalities in Japan
Japanese gravure idols
Japanese-language singers of Taiwan
Actresses from Taichung
Atayal people
Taiwanese Buddhists
Taiwanese expatriates in Japan
Taiwanese film actresses
Taiwanese female models
Taiwanese Mandopop singer-songwriters
Taiwanese television actresses
Taiwanese voice actresses
Taiwanese idols
20th-century Taiwanese women singers
21st-century Taiwanese women singers
Musicians from Taichung
Taiwanese people of Hakka descent